Bulgarian nationality law is governed by the Constitution of Bulgaria (article 25 and 26) of 1991 and the citizenship law of 1999 (with changes made in various years through to 2009).

It is mainly based on jus sanguinis; however, it is possible to obtain citizenship after 5 years of residence in Bulgaria. Naturalisation is available on the basis of residence in certain types of status; marriage or on the basis of origin or at the discretion of the government of Bulgaria to persons of merit. The Bulgarian Ministry of Justice is in charge of processing citizenship applications.

Every Bulgarian citizen is also a citizen of the European Union.

Acquisition of Bulgarian citizenship

Bulgarian citizenship can be acquired in the following ways:

 : By descent if at least one of the parents is a Bulgarian citizen;
 : By birth in Bulgaria (unless citizenship of another country has been acquired by descent), or a child found in Bulgaria whose parents are unknown;
 By naturalisation: If the applicant: 
 is 18 or older;
 has been a holder of a long-term or permanent residence permit for at least 5 years, or 3 years if the applicant is married to a Bulgarian national, was born in Bulgaria, or settled in the country before the age of 18;
 has not been convicted of a premeditated crime;
 has a source of income or a trade and can financially support themselves;
 has a good command of the Bulgarian language.

Dual citizenship
Bulgaria permits dual citizenship only for native-born citizens, citizens of the EU, EEA and Switzerland, as well as spouses of Bulgarian citizens. Naturalised citizens who do not belong to at least one of the aforementioned groups, are required to give up all other nationalities. Those who previously renounced their Bulgarian citizenship are allowed to get it reinstated. Some countries do not permit multiple citizenship e.g. adults who have acquired Bulgarian and Japanese citizenship by birth must declare, to the latter's Ministry of Justice, before turning 22, which citizenship they want to keep.

Citizenship of the European Union
Since Bulgaria is member of the European Union, Bulgarian citizens are also citizens of the European Union under European Union law and thus have the right of freedom of movement within the EU and have the right to vote in elections for the European Parliament. When in a non-EU country where there is no Bulgarian embassy or representation, Bulgarian citizens have the right to receive consular protection from the embassy of any other EU country present in that third country. Bulgarian citizens can live and work in any country within the EU and EFTA as a result of the right of free movement and residence granted in Article 21 of the EU Treaty.

Travel freedom of Bulgarian citizens

Visa requirements for Bulgarian citizens are administrative entry restrictions by the authorities of other states placed on citizens of Bulgaria. In 2015, Bulgarian citizens had visa-free or visa-on-arrival access to 150 countries and territories, ranking the Bulgarian passport 18th in the world according to the Visa Restrictions Index.

In 2017, the Bulgarian nationality is ranked twenty-sixth in the Nationality Index (QNI). This index differs from the Visa Restrictions Index, which focuses on external factors including travel freedom. The QNI considers, in addition to travel freedom, on internal factors such as peace & stability, economic strength, and human development as well.

See also

Citizenship of the European Union
 Bulgarian passport
 Bulgarian identity card
 Uniform civil number

References

External links
Ministry of Justice

Nationality law
Bulgaria and the European Union
Law of Bulgaria